Caffrocrambus decolorellus is a moth in the family Crambidae. It was described by Francis Walker in 1863. It is found in South Africa.

References

Endemic moths of South Africa
Crambinae
Moths described in 1863
Moths of Africa